Miho Imai (born 29 May 1987) is a Japanese cyclist and a multiple time Japanese national champion.

Personal life
She works as a teacher at Shinden Elementary School in Maebashi, Japan.

Career
She has represented Japan in cyclo-cross at international level, competing at the 2017 World Championships in Luxembourg. Imai won the Japanese national championships in 2018, 2019 and 2020. She focused on mountain bike racing after it was included on the programme for the Olympic Games. She was selected for the Japanese team for the cross-country race.

References

1987 births
Living people
Japanese female cyclists
Place of birth missing (living people)
Olympic cyclists of Japan
Cyclists at the 2020 Summer Olympics